Cascada (Spanish for "Waterfall", stylized as CASCADA, CASCADA and cascada) is a German dance music act founded in 2004 by singer Natalie Horler and DJs/producers DJ Manian and DJ Yanou. They are best known for their hit singles "Everytime We Touch", "What Hurts the Most", "Evacuate the Dancefloor", and "Miracle". Cascada represented Germany at the Eurovision Song Contest 2013 in Malmö, Sweden with "Glorious".
While being one of the most successful acts of the dance music genre itself, Cascada was named as the 3rd most successful German act of the 21st century.

In 2010, Cascada's music was the second most downloaded of all time in the dance category after David Guetta.

In 2018, Cascada had more than a billion views on YouTube including over 100 million views for their hit "Everytime We Touch".

Music career

2004–2005: Early career
When Natalie Horler was 17 in 1998, she was doing studio work for various DJs. Eventually, she met Yanou and DJ Manian. At that time Yanou was 24 and DJ Manian was 20. Originally, they released music under the name Cascade, but due to Kaskade, another artist with a similar name, threatening legal action, they changed it to Cascada. They simultaneously released music under the names of Siria, 3XM, Phalanx, Scarf!, Diamond and Akira as well but ended those projects due to the success of Cascada. Under Andorfine Records, they produced their debut and hit single, "Miracle", and its follow-up, "Bad Boy", in Germany. This caught the attention of the American dance label Robbins Entertainment. They negotiated a contract and "Miracle" was released in 2004. However, it did not attract much attention, so Cascada offered them "Everytime We Touch".

2005–2007: Everytime We Touch
Cascada experienced mainstream success in the United Kingdom and the United States almost a year after releasing their second American single, "Everytime We Touch", which interpolates the chorus of a 1992 Maggie Reilly song of the same name. The song gained platinum and gold certifications across the globe, being certified platinum by the RIAA.  Soon after the popularity of the single skyrocketed, an album was recorded and released in a matter of months, and a music video for "Everytime We Touch" was also distributed for promotion.

A total of seven singles were released from the album, four of which have been released in the United Kingdom: "Everytime We Touch", "Truly Madly Deeply" (originally by Savage Garden), "Miracle" and "A Neverending Dream"  (originally by X-Perience), all of which gained top 10 status apart from "A Neverending Dream", which charted at #46. The U.S. saw the re-release of "Miracle" shortly after "Everytime We Touch"'s breakthrough, receiving high radio rotation and reaching the lower ends of the U.S. charts. Their album Everytime We Touch has experienced success in the UK Album chart where it remained up in the top forty for twenty-four weeks, peaking at No. 2. The album experienced success on the U.S. charts as well. The success of the album gained them two World Music Award nominations, winning the World's Best-Selling German Artist. On February 12, 2010, a Premium Edition of the album was released featuring remixes from Pulsedriver, Tune Up!, and an exclusive vocal edit from ItaloBrothers.

2007–2009: Perfect Day
At the end of 2007, Cascada released their second album, Perfect Day in the UK and several Northern European countries, followed by the remaining markets in the first quarter of 2008, The album contained cover versions of Avril Lavigne's "Sk8er Boi", Pink's "Just Like A Pill", Patti Smith's "Because the Night" and the Jeffrey Steele song "What Hurts the Most", as well as two tracks, "Endless Summer" and "I Will Believe It", that were previously recorded by Horler and DJ Manian under the discontinued Siria name.  However, the U.S. version, which was released last, replaced the Siria songs and the Pink and Avril Lavigne cover versions with three other tracks, because they could not obtain the North American rights. The lead single, "What Hurts the Most", was released in late 2007 and early 2008, along with its B-side, a cover version of Wham!'s "Last Christmas". The single had high success, reaching the top ten in most countries. In the UK and Germany, "What Do You Want From Me?" and "Because the Night" were released as a follow-up single. In the United States, "Faded" and "Perfect Day" were released as singles, but received little airplay outside of the dance-radio circuit.

2009–2010: Evacuate the Dancefloor

On 29 June 2009, "Evacuate the Dancefloor" was released in the UK. The release, just four days after the death of Michael Jackson, was expected to chart below Jackson's old hits, which sold heavily after his death. Instead, it debuted at No. 1, above Jackson's "Man in the Mirror". The song went on to the top five in Australia, Canada, France, Germany, Ireland, and New Zealand, as well as top ten in many more. The song was released in the U.S. in late September release, and peaked at 25 in seventeen weeks, making it the group's second top-forty hit.

The song has become a club staple, used in many dance-oriented video games, and even nominated for an MTV Video Music Award. The album, also named Evacuate the Dancefloor, was released a week later on 6 July in the UK and Germany. The album continued Cascada's progression into electro-pop, the change was welcomed by mainstream audiences and fans, yet many fans still missed the euro-pop feel they considered integral to the Cascada project. The album itself did not mirror the success of the single, yet it did chart in the top ten of many countries, including the UK where it went on to sell 100,000 copies. "Dangerous" and "Fever" were follow-up singles released from the album, the former in the UK, and the latter in the US, Australia, and the rest of Europe, neither experiencing success in terms of radio spins, digital, or physical sales. Nevertheless, the group toured extensively to promote the album, even opening for Britney Spears during a stop in Germany.

2010–2011: Original Me
A new single "Pyromania" was released in 2010, continuing their new electropop sound. During the summer of 2010, elements of a song titled “Night Nurse" began to leak online. A music video featuring Horler in full body paint of various colors in many scenes was released in November 2010 to promote the upcoming album.

On the weekend of 26 March 2011, Cascada shot two music videos for the upcoming singles "San Francisco" and "Au Revoir". Both videos were directed by Lisa Mann and choreographed by Luther Brown, and both singles were featured on the album Original Me which was released on 20 June 2011 (UK), and 29 November 2011 in the US.

After the release of the album, Horler posed for Playboy Deutschland in July 2011, to mixed reactions from fans and critics. On 1 September 2011, US label Robbins Entertainment announced on their message board that Cascada and Robbins have amicably parted ways, and Cascada were released from the label, citing creative differences as the reason for their departure. It was also announced that Original Me would still be released, under their Zooland label.

2012–2013: The Best of Cascada, Eurovision Song Contest 2013 and Acoustic Sessions
On 7 January 2012, Horler joined the jury of German singing contest Deutschland sucht den Superstar. On 16 March 2012, the music video for "Summer of Love" premiered in Germany, followed by the compilation album Back on the Dancefloor.

In early June 2012, a video clip of Horler performing a cover of Corona's "The Rhythm of the Night" surfaced online. "The Rhythm of the Night" was released on 22 June 2012 in Germany and in the USA.

On 30 November 2012, Cascada released a Christmas Album, It's Christmas Time, which included a cover version of Wham!'s "Last Christmas" and a brand new track, "Somewhere At Christmas Time". Natalie Horler's uncle, David Horler played the trombone on two of the tracks.

On 8 February 2013, Cascada released the single "Glorious". A week later, they won the German qualification for the Eurovision Song Contest 2013 with this song. On 18 May 2013, Cascada earned 18 points in the Eurovision Final, putting them in 21st place in a field of 26 contestants.

Around this time, Cascada released their second greatest hits album, The Best of Cascada, this included brand new track "The World is in My Hands" which went onto become follow up single after Eurovision. They also returned to the studio to work on an acoustic album, which was released as Acoustic Sessions on 1 November 2013. The album comprises acoustic versions of the band's hits as well as a few cover versions of other songs, most notably "You" performed by both Natalie and Robin Stjernberg.

2014–present: Focus on touring and new singles

On 28 March 2014, Cascada's new single, titled "Blink", was released in Germany with the video premiering on the same day. The track was originally recorded by pop group U.V.U.K. In April 2014, the single was released in Australia and France, and also began receiving airplay in the UK.

According to a 2014 interview, the group have no plans to release a 5th studio album but are working on a new single. For this single, "Madness", Cascada collaborated with Manchester-based rapper Tristan 'Tris' Henry The single was released on 26 September 2014 worldwide, with the video premiering on YouTube on 30 September. On 20 February 2015, the band released a re-work of "Reason", a song originally released in 2004 under the previous alias 'Diamond'. The video was shot in Mallorca and premiered on 20 February 2015.

On 28 May 2015, Horler took a short break due to her pregnancy. All upcoming shows were canceled; fans were rest-assured that new music was "in the works" and photos showed Horler in the studio during the summer. In September 2015, Horler gave birth to her daughter, Jamie. Cascada returned to the stage in December 2015, with upcoming shows in Norway, Austria and Germany. On New Year's Eve, they performed in London along with The X Factor contestant Fleur East.

For the better part of 2016, Horler was busy touring parts of Norway and the United Kingdom, while also working the studio with Yanou on new material. Brazilian producer Cassiano collaborated with Cascada on a cover version of "Praise You" by Mary Mary. This was released on 10 June 2016.

After a two-year break from releasing music, Cascada returned with a new single "Run" on 27 January 2017. Horler stated in an interview at the time that they still plan to release singles instead of a full album, and they already have a new song lined up for release. On 20 April 2017, Cascada released "Playground", the official song of the 2017 Ice Hockey World Championship held in Cologne, Germany and Paris, France. Natalie Horler performed the song for the opening ceremony on 4 May 2017.

In the summer of 2018, a new single entitled "Back For Good" was released. Hardwell and Maurice West released a remix of "Everytime We Touch" at this time too.

A year later, Cascada released their next single "Like the Way I Do" in August 2019. Horler stated it was one of her favourite tracks they have done. In March 2020, a ballad version of the track was released. In October 2020, Cascada released a cover of "I'm Feeling It (In the Air)". The track was previously released in 2017 by Sunset Bros & Mark McCabe. It was released in the UK by Xploded Music. The track brings Cascada back to their clubland roots.

In May 2021, Natalie announced through an interview that "One Last Dance" would be released on 4 June 2021 and would be a collaboration with Canadian 1980s synth band Trans-X. On 5 November 2021, Cascada, along with Timmy Trumpet and Harris & Ford, released their single, "Never Let Me Go" on Spinnin Records.

Discography

Studio albums
2006: Everytime We Touch
2007: Perfect Day
2009: Evacuate the Dancefloor
2011: Original Me

Tours
2007 : Everytime We Touch Tour
2008 : Clubland Live Tour
2008 : Perfect Day Tour
2009 : Clubland Live Tour
2011 : Original Me Tour
2018 : Wild Nights Tour - Australia only (June)

Awards and nominations

References

External links
Official Cascada Site

 
German Eurodance groups
Robbins Entertainment artists
Germany in the Eurovision Song Contest
Eurovision Song Contest entrants of 2013
Eurovision Song Contest entrants for Germany
Musical groups established in 2004
2004 establishments in Germany
Musical groups from North Rhine-Westphalia
Spinnin' Records artists
All Around the World Productions artists